Fushun Leifeng Stadium (Simplified Chinese: 雷峰体育场) is a multi-purpose stadium in Shuncheng District, Fushun, Liaoning Province, China.  It is currently used mostly for football matches and is the home ground of Liaoning FC of the China PR Super League.  The stadium holds 32,000.

References

Football venues in China
Buildings and structures in Fushun
Multi-purpose stadiums in China
Sports venues in Liaoning